Arkéa Arena (previously known as the Bordeaux Métropole Arena) is a multi-purpose indoor arena in Floirac, near Bordeaux in France. Opened in January 2018, it offers a capacity for all types of shows and events from 2,500 to 11,300. The arena is mainly used for concerts and sporting events.

Construction

Lagardère Live Entertainment (agent and operator), Bouygues Bâtiment Centre Sud-Ouest (a subsidiary of Bouygues Construction), and architect Rudy Ricciotti won the tender on 20 December 2013. The building permit was granted in July 2015, work started in early 2016, and the first stone was laid on 11 April 2016. The construction ends in January 2018. It was designed by the architect to look like a pebble, deposited on the shore by the Garonne river that flows alongside.

The project meets the need to create a concert hall in the Bordeaux Métropole capable of hosting tours of international artists, which the Patinoire de Mériadeck ice rink does not allow.

History
The official inauguration took place on 24 January 2018 with a concert by Depeche Mode during their Global Spirit Tour, with 11,000 tickets sold out in minutes. On 3 October 2018, Crédit Mutuel Arkéa obtained the naming rights of the venue, which officially becomes "Arkéa Arena". This sponsorship is confirmed for a period of 10 years.

Events

Concerts

Transport
The TBM network serves the arena and is accessible from the ring road via the interchanges. On event days, a shuttle bus operates from Porte de Bourgogne station connecting the arena to the Bordeaux tramway network. The service starts 2 hours before a show begins and terminates approximately one hour after a performance finishes.

A paid parking of 962 places is annexed to the venue and is operated by the company Parcub (parking control of the métropole).

A VCUB bike station is located nearby with 20 docking points. 500 bicycle spaces are also available.

See also
 List of indoor arenas in France

References

External links

 

Indoor arenas in France
Music venues in France
Sports venues in Gironde
Sports venues completed in 2018
2018 establishments in France
Music venues completed in 2018
Rudy Ricciotti buildings
21st-century architecture in France